The women's qualification for the Olympic beach volleyball tournament will occur between January 2023 and June 2024. The competition will comprise a total of 24 women's beach volleyball pairs coming from different NOCs, similar to those in the previous editions; each NOC can enter a maximum of two pairs in the men's tournament. As the host nation, France reserves the direct spot for the women's beach volleyball pair. 

The remainder of the twenty-four team field must endure a tripartite qualification pathway to obtain a ticket for Paris 2024, abiding by the universality principle and respecting the two-pair NOC limit. The initial spot will be directly awarded to the women's winners, respectively, from the 2023 FIVB World Championships, scheduled for 6 to 15 October in Tlaxcala, Mexico, with the seventeen highest-ranked eligible women's pairs joining them in the field through the FIVB Olympic ranking list (based on the twelve best performances achieved as a pair) between 1 January 2023 and 10 June 2024. The events valid for ranking results include but are not limited to the following:
 2023 FIVB World Championships
 2023–2024 Beach Pro Tour (Elite, Challenge, Future, and Finals)
 2023–2024 FIVB Continental Tours Finals

The final five spots will be attributed to the highest-ranked eligible NOCs from each of the five continental qualification tournaments, namely the AVC Continental Cup Final for Asia and Oceania; the CAVB Continental Cup Final for Africa; the CEV Continental Cup Final for Europe; the CSV Continental Cup Final for South America; and the NORCECA Continental Cup Final for North America, Central America, and the Caribbean. The final phase of these five events will occur between 13 and 23 June 2024.

Qualification summary
{| class="wikitable" width=80%
|-
!width=30%|Qualification!!width=23%|Date!!width=18%|Host!!width=10%|Berths!!width=15%|Qualified NOC
|-
|Host nation
|colspan=2 
|style="text-align:center"|1
|
|-
|2023 FIVB World Championships ||6–15 October 2023|| Tlaxcala 
|align=center|1
|
|-
|rowspan=17|FIVB Beach Volleyball Olympic Ranking
|rowspan=17|10 June 2024
|rowspan=17| Lausanne
|rowspan=17 align=center|17
|
|-
|
|-
|
|-
|
|-
|
|-
|
|-
|
|-
|
|-
|
|-
|
|-
|
|-
|
|-
|
|-
|
|-
|
|-
|
|-
|
|-
||2023–2024 AVC Continental Cup Final
|rowspan=5|13–23 June 2024
|rowspan=5|TBA
|style="text-align:center;"|1
|
|-
|2023–2024 CAVB Continental Cup Final
|style="text-align:center;"|1
|
|-
|2023–2024 CEV Continental Cup Final
|style="text-align:center;"|1
|
|-
|2023–2024 CSV Continental Cup Final
|style="text-align:center;"|1
|
|-
|2023–2024 NORCECA Continental Cup Final
|style="text-align:center;"|1
|
|-
!colspan="3"| Total!!24!!
|}

Host country
FIVB reserved a berth for the 2024 Summer Olympics host country to participate in the beach volleyball tournament.

2023 FIVB World Championships

The winning women's pair of the 2023 FIVB World Championships, scheduled for 6 to 15 October in Tlaxcala, Mexico, will secure a spot for Paris 2024.

Bracket

Rankings

2023–2024 FIVB Olympic Rankings
The seventeen highest-ranked eligible women's pairs will secure a direct spot for Paris 2024 based on the FIVB Olympic ranking points accrued in the twelve best performances as a pair from 1 January 2023 to 10 June 2024. The events valid for ranking results include but are not limited to the following:
 2023 FIVB World Championships
 2023–2024 Beach Pro Tour (Elite, Challenge, Future, and Finals)
 2023–2024 FIVB Continental Tours Finals

Continental Cup Final
The final five spots will be attributed to the highest-ranked eligible NOCs from each of the five continental qualification tournaments (Africa; Asia and Oceania; Europe; North America, Central America, and the Caribbean; and South America). The final phase of these five events will occur between 13 and 23 June 2024.

Africa

Bracket

Rankings

Asia and Oceania

Bracket

Rankings

Europe

Bracket

Rankings

North America, Central America, and the Caribbean

Bracket

Rankings

South America

Bracket

Rankings

References

Qualification for the 2024 Summer Olympics